The Mataikona River is a river of the Wairarapa of New Zealand's North Island.

See also
List of rivers of New Zealand
List of rivers of Wellington Region

References

Rivers of the Wellington Region
Rivers of New Zealand